Ben Starav is a mountain in the Lorn region of Argyll, in the Scottish Highlands. Its peak is surrounded by several ridges, steep corries and waterfalls. It is the highest in a group of mountains that include Glas Bheinn Mhòr, Beinn nan Aighenan and Stob Coir' an Albannaich.

References

Munros
Marilyns of Scotland
Mountains and hills of Highland (council area)
Mountains and hills of Argyll and Bute
One-thousanders of Scotland